Jonathon James Casey (born March 29, 1962) is an American former professional ice hockey goaltender. He played in the National Hockey League with the Minnesota North Stars, Boston Bruins, and St. Louis Blues from 1984 to 1997.

Early life
Jon Casey was born in Grand Rapids, Minnesota, to James and Colleen Casey. He is the second of four children. He played college hockey for the University of North Dakota from 1980 to 1984 and was part of two NCAA National Championship teams, in 1980 and 1982.

Playing career
Casey spent most of his career with the Minnesota North Stars. In 1989-90, Casey tied Patrick Roy and Daren Puppa for the league lead in wins with 31. In 1993, he was a part of the Campbell Conference's roster at the 44th National Hockey League All-Star Game. Casey would also spend time with the Boston Bruins and St. Louis Blues.

Casey is best remembered for two famous moments when he was scored upon. The first, when Mario Lemieux split two North Stars defensemen (Neil Wilkinson and Shawn Chambers) and scored past Casey in the decisive Game 5 of the 1991 Stanley Cup Finals. The second came in the 1996 Stanley Cup playoffs when Steve Yzerman scored the game-winning goal in 2OT of Game 7 of the Western Conference semifinals with a long shot from the blue line.

Career statistics

Regular season and playoffs

International

Awards and honors

Played in NHL All-Star Game (1993)
AHL First All-Star Team (1985) 
Harry ``Hap'' Holmes Memorial Award (fewest goals against - AHL) (1985) 
Aldege "Baz" Bastien Memorial Award (Outstanding Goaltender - AHL) (1985)

Transactions
Signed as free agent by Minnesota North Stars, April 1, 1984.
Traded by the Dallas Stars to the Boston Bruins for Andy Moog to complete deal in which Boston sends Gord Murphy to Dallas for future considerations, June 25, 1993.
Signed as free agent by the St. Louis Blues, June 30, 1994.
Retired from professional hockey, December 16, 1997.

References

External links
 

1962 births
Living people
American men's ice hockey goaltenders
Baltimore Skipjacks players
Boston Bruins players
Ice hockey players from Minnesota
Sportspeople from Grand Rapids, Minnesota
Indianapolis Checkers players
Kalamazoo Wings (1974–2000) players
Kansas City Blades players
Minnesota North Stars players
National Hockey League All-Stars
NCAA men's ice hockey national champions
Peoria Rivermen (IHL) players
St. Louis Blues players
Springfield Indians players
Undrafted National Hockey League players
North Dakota Fighting Hawks men's ice hockey players
Worcester IceCats players
AHCA Division I men's ice hockey All-Americans